Flitwick Castle was an 11th-century castle located in the town of Flitwick, in the county of Bedfordshire, England.

It was a small, timber Motte-and-bailey castle, surrounded by a moat. The castle was mentioned in the Domesday Book, in 1086, as being under the ownership of William Lovet, a Norman. Lovet had displaced Alwin, who had been the Saxon owner of Flitwick prior to the Norman Invasion.

The earthwork remains of the castle are on what is now a public green space known as Temple Field or Mount Hill. The name Temple Field takes its name from the nearby church. The site is a Scheduled Monument.

See also
Castles in Great Britain and Ireland
List of castles in England

References

External links 
 
 English Heritage Monument No. 360080

Castles in Bedfordshire
Scheduled monuments in Bedfordshire
Flitwick